Ōrongohau | Best New Zealand Poems is an annual online anthology of poems chosen by guest editors. The anthology began in 2001 and is published by the International Institute of Modern Letters at Victoria University of Wellington in New Zealand. It is supported by a grant from Creative New Zealand.

History
In 2001, poet and professor Bill Manhire of the International Institute of Modern Letters founded Best New Zealand Poems. The anthology is published online and features 25 poems from New Zealand poets, each year selected by a different guest editor. Journalist Philip Matthews has described it as "a reliable guide to local poetry". The first annual editor, Iain Sharp, wrote in his introduction to the 2001 selection that the site's approach was inspired by The Best American Poetry series. He also noted that the poems must have been published that year either in magazines or books, and that in order to qualify as New Zealand poetry, a "steady association with the country is sufficient".

Due to Manhire's association with the anthology and role as series editor, his own poems were originally ineligible for inclusion. In his introduction to the 2005 selection, Andrew Johnston wrote, "I couldn't include a poem from Manhire's latest and best book, Lifted, because he is effectively the publisher of Best New Zealand Poems." In 2011 Manhire stepped down from the series editor role, and his poem "The Schoolbus" was selected by editor Bernadette Hall.

In 2003, Shelley Howells, a columnist for The New Zealand Herald, noted the features on the website, including links to publishers, New Zealand literary sites, poet biographies, and poets' comments on their work, provide a "more bang for your verse' approach" that is "more satisfying than simply reading a poem on a page".

In 2007, Manhire noted that most of the website's viewers were from overseas, and that the online publication allowed the anthology to break "through the distribution barrier which prevents New Zealand poetry from reaching an international audience".

Annual selections
Unlike Best American Poetry, each year's selection is identified by the year in which the poems were first published, not by the year in which the selection is put out: so the 2001 list, for instance, came out in 2002.

2001
The editor, Iain Sharp, is books editor of the Sunday Star-Times and himself a poet and critic. In his introduction, Sharp wrote that although he has a preference for poets like Billy Collins, he tried to include a variety of poets in his selection. Sharp also wrote that he found it impossible to properly excerpt Michael O'Leary's book-length love poem, He Waiatanui Kia Aroha, or take a single poem out of Hone Tuwhare's Piggyback Moon because none "seemed quite to capture the warm, rebellious spirit of the whole."

James K. Baxter
Jenny Bornholdt
Bernard Brown
James Brown
Alan Brunton
Kate Camp
Alistair Te Ariki Campbell
Allen Curnow
Leigh Davis
Chloe Gordon
Bernadette Hall
Dinah Hawken
Anna Jackson
Jan Kemp
James Naughton
Gregory O'Brien
Peter Olds
Bob Orr
Vincent O'Sullivan
Chris Price
Richard Reeve
Elizabeth Smither
Brian Turner
Ian Wedde
Nick Williamson

2002
This year's editor, Elizabeth Smither, recalled what Allen Curnow, a New Zealand poet who died in 2001, said about "the visceral nature of true poetry. 'Try poking it with a stick and see if it’s alive,’ was Allen’s test for a poem and it has been my first line of selection." Smither also used her assumptive "editor's privilege" to wedge in a 26th poem at the end of her introduction: Jon Bridges' "Poem for the Beasts".

Jenny Bornholdt
Diana Bridge
Rachel Bush
Kate Camp
Glenn Colquhoun
Murray Edmond
Paula Green
Michael Harlow
David Howard
Andrew Johnston
Anne Kennedy
Michele Leggott
Emma Neale
Bob Orr
Chris Orsman
Vincent O'Sullivan
Bill Sewell
Anna Smaill
Kendrick Smithyman
C. K. Stead
Robert Sullivan
Jo Thorpe
Rae Varcoe
Louise Wrightson
Sonja Yelich

2003
This year's editor, Robin Dudding, citing a similar comment by John Ashbery in The Best American Poetry 1988, discounted the idea that the best 25 poems of a country can be picked, since any editor will be inevitably biased and won't be able to find all the best poems. It might be better to call the selection "OK New Zealand poems", Dudding indicated.

"There seem to be two possible selection approaches: attempt to find worthy examples of as wide a range of poetic expression as possible; or plump for the poems that you like best, even if there is the risk of too markedly revealing one’s own taste or lack of taste," Dudding wrote. He and his wife, who helped with the selection, "plumped fairly firmly for the latter course." They included Robin Hyde who died in 1906 on the basis that many of her poems were first published in 2003.

Iain Sharp, in a review for the Sunday Star-Times, said the 2003 selection "doesn't contain a single dud" and noted that Dudding was "widely regarded as the country's most astute literary editor".

David Beach
Peter Bland
Jenny Bornholdt
Kate Camp
Gordon Challis
Geoff Cochrane
Fiona Farrell
Cliff Fell
Sia Figiel
Rhian Gallagher
Robin Hyde
Kevin Ireland
Anna Jackson
Anne Kennedy
Graham Lindsay
Anna Livesey
Karlo Mila
James Norcliffe
Gregory O'Brien
Bob Orr
Chris Price
Sarah Quigley
Elizabeth Smither
Brian Turner
Richard von Sturmer

2004
Emma Neale, this year's editor, in her introduction proclaimed Ahmed Zaoui's "In a Dream" (translated in a "chain of versions" in brief 31, Spring 2004), "if not the best, then the most important poem this year", because of the political issues involved in Zaoui's circumstances (or as Neale put it, for "its role as a nexus of politics and aesthetics"): He sought refugee status in New Zealand and had been imprisoned for two years, as of the time Neale wrote, on suspicion of ties to terrorists. She added that he hadn't been brought to trial "in accordance with United Nations human rights conventions." Although Auden said "Poetry makes nothing happen," Neale said a poem can lend support to a political cause powered by other means.

"When I read a fine poem," Neale wrote, "there is usually a sense of actively arriving at layers of new knowledge, of discovering experience, or even belief, simultaneously with the speaker or personality in that poem. All of the poems I’ve chosen exhibit something of this character."

 Tusiata Avia
 Hinemoana Baker
 Diane Brown
 James Brown
 Geoff Cochrane
 Linda Connell
 Wystan Curnow
 Anne French
 Paula Green
 David Howard
 Andrew Johnston
 Tim Jones
 Anne Kennedy
 Tze Ming Mok
 Peter Olds
 Vincent O'Sullivan
 Vivienne Plumb
 Richard Reeve
 Elizabeth Smither
 Kendrick Smithyman
 C. K. Stead
 Brian Turner
 Sue Wootton
 Sonja Yelich
 Ashleigh Young

2005

In his introduction, Andrew Johnston (this year's editor) wrote that New Zealand poetry used to be very much like British poetry still is today, which he described as "domesticated", "unsurprising", "well-behaved" and closely following "a single register, the poet getting quietly worked up about something in the plainest conversational tone."

The influence of American poetry loosened up New Zealand's poets, according to Johnston, so that the nation's poetry today has a variety of voices and styles, and there is also a tolerance in the country for different kinds of poetry. Bill Manhire and Ian Wedde were two of the poets who helped bring about the revolution, he added.

 Michele Amas
 Angela Andrews
 Stu Bagby
 Jenny Bornholdt
 James Brown
 Janet Charman
 Geoff Cochrane
 Mary Cresswell
 Wystan Curnow
 Stephanie de Montalk
 Fiona Farrell
 Bernadette Hall
 Anne Kennedy
 Michele Leggott
 Anna Livesey
 Karlo Mila
 James Norcliffe
 Gregory O'Brien
 Vivienne Plumb
 Anna Smaill
 Elizabeth Smither
 Robert Sullivan
Brian Turner
 Ian Wedde
 Sonja Yelich

2006

The editors for 2006 were literary couple Anne Kennedy and Robert Sulivan, both of whom were listed in the previous year's selection. The editors commented that 2006 seemed to have produced proportionally far fewer poems by Maori and Asian writers than appeared in other years. They speculated that such writers were either not seeking publication, or not achieving it. They noted that "So much in writing, from our experience, depends upon the encouragement of publishers, editors and educators."

"In selecting this year’s Best New Zealand Poems we did our best" the editors said, "to scout the diverse ethnic and intellectual communities that New Zealand poets belong to." Despite the editorial emphasis on diversity, 11 of the 25 poems selected were published in association with Victoria University. Of the remaining 14 poems, 8 were published in association with the University of Auckland; leaving just five poems that were not released under the aegis of either University. 

The fact that both poets reside in Honolulu, and had to rely in part on "the help of the Institute of Modern Letters team who sent us care packages from home" may account for this curious distribution. However, the editors themselves emphasise the broad range of poetry they scoured to create this list. "As well as reading books by individual poets, we read poems from anthologies, magazines, arts journals, e-journals and other websites."

 Hinemoana Baker
 Cherie Barford
 Jenny Bornholdt
 James Brown
 Alistair Te Ariki Campbell
 Geoff Cochrane
 Murray Edmond
 David Eggleton
 Cliff Fell
 Brian Flaherty
 Paula Green
 Bernadette Hall
 Anna Jackson
 Andrew Johnston
 Michele Leggott
 Selina Tusitala Marsh
 Karlo Mila
 Gregory O'Brien
 Brian Potiki
Chris Price
 Elizabeth Smither
 C. K. Stead
 JC Sturm
 Richard von Sturmer
 Alison Wong

2007
The year's guest editor is Paula Green, who wrote that Chris Price's poem, "Harriet and the Matches" was the "scorchingly best" poem, which she reprinted in her introduction, although Price's work was not on the list of 25 selections. In her introduction, Green gave a list of "a simultaneous cluster of best poems" by these poets: Saradha Koirala Erin Scudder, Harry Ricketts, Ashleigh Young, Helen Rickerby, Tusiata Avia, Sue Wootton, Marty Smith, S. K. Johnson, Kay McKenzie Cooke, David Howard, Jennifer Compton, Wystan Curnow, Richard von Sturmer, Sue Reidy, Charlotte Simmons, Rae Varcoe, Fiona Kidman, Jack Ross, Airini Beautrais, Amy Brown, Katherine Liddy, Thérèse Lloyd, and Scott Kendrick. As had Kennedy and Sullivan in the previous year's introduction, Green complained that there weren't more Maori and Asian poems published during the year. But there were plenty of submissions overall, she wrote, "At one point in January the stack of best poems on my floor stood at 20 cms [sic]."

 Johanna Aitchison 
 Angela Andrews 
 Serie (Cherie) Barford 
 Sarah Jane Barnett 
 Jenny Bornholdt
 Alistair Te Ariki Campbell 
 Janet Charman 
 Geoff Cochrane 
 Fiona Farrell 
 Cliff Fell 
 Bernadette Hall 
 Anna Jackson 
 Andrew Johnston 
 Anne Kennedy 
 Jessica Le Bas 
 Dora Malech 
 Alice Miller 
 Emma Neale 
 Vincent O'Sullivan 
 Vivienne Plumb 
 Richard Reeve 
 Elizabeth Smither 
 C. K. Stead 
 Robert Sullivan 
 Alison Wong

2008
2008's guest editor was James Brown.

 Johanna Aitchison
 Hinemoana Baker
 Emma Barnes
 David Beach
 Peter Bland
 Jenny Bornholdt
 Amy Brown
 Cliff Fell
 Joan Fleming
 Bernadette Hall
 Sam Hunt
 Lynn Jenner
 Michele Leggott
 Jean McCormack
 Emma Neale
 Gregory O'Brien
 Bob Orr
 Chris Orsman
 Richard Reeve
 Sam Sampson
 Kerrin P. Sharpe
 Tim Upperton
 Richard von Sturmer
 Tom Weston
 Sonja Yelich

2009
2009's guest editor was Robyn Marsack.

 Tusiata Avia
 Sarah Broom
 Geoff Cochrane
 Jennifer Compton
 Lynn Davidson
 John Gallas
 Bernadette Hall
 David Howard
 Lynn Jenner
 Brent Kininmont
 Michele Leggott
 Emma Neale
 James Norcliffe
 Gregory O'Brien
 Chris Price
 Kerrin P. Sharpe
 Marty Smith
 Elizabeth Smither
 C. K. Stead
 Brian Turner
 Tim Upperton
 Louise Wallace
 Ian Wedde
 Douglas Wright
 Ashleigh Young

2010
2010's guest editor was Chris Price.

 Fleur Adcock
 Hinemoana Baker
 Emma Barnes
 Sarah Jane Barnett
 Miro Bilbrough
 Jenny Bornholdt
 James Brown
 Kate Camp
 Geoff Cochrane
 Jennifer Compton
 David Eggleton
 Cliff Fell
 John Gallas
 Anna Jackson
 Lynn Jenner
 Anne Kennedy
 Anna Livesey
 Cilla McQueen
 David Mitchell
 Bill Nelson
 John Newton
 Gregory O'Brien
 Kerrin P Sharpe
 Elizabeth Smither
 Ian Wedde

2011
2011's guest editor was Bernadette Hall.

 John Adams
 Tusiata Avia
 Hera Lindsay Bird
 Peter Bland
 Rachel Bush
 Zarah Butcher-McGunnigle
 Joan Fleming
 Janis Freegard
 Rhian Gallagher
 Rob Hack
 Dinah Hawken
 Anna Jackson
 Brent Kininmont
 Michele Leggott
 Helen Lehndorf
 Kate McKinstry
 Bill Manhire
 Harvey Molloy
 James Norcliffe
 Rachel O'Neill
 Marty Smith
 Rānui Taiapa
 Tim Upperton
 Louise Wallace
 Douglas Write

2012
2012's guest editor was Ian Wedde.

 Sarah Jane Barnett
 Tony Beyer
 James Brown
 Zarah Butcher-McGunnigle
 Kate Camp
 Geoff Cochrane
 Murray Edmond
 John Gallas
 Siobhan Harvey
 Helen Heath
 David Howard
 Andrew Johnston
 Anne Kennedy
 Aleksandra Lane
 Michele Leggott
 Frankie McMillan
 Gregory O'Brien
 Peter Olds
 Harry Ricketts
 Sam Sampson
 Kerrin P Sharpe
 C K Stead
 Richard von Sturmer
 Albert Wendt
 Ashleigh Young

2013
2013's guest editors were Mark Williams and Jane Stafford.

Fleur Adcock
Hinemoana Baker
Sarah Broom
Amy Brown
Kate Camp
Mary-Jane Duffy
Murray Edmond
Johanna Emeney
Cliff Fell
Bernadette Hall
Dinah Hawken
Caoilinn Hughes
Anna Jackson
Anne Kennedy
Michele Leggott
Therese Lloyd
Selina Tusitala Marsh
John Newton
Gregory O'Brien
Rachel O'Neill
Vincent O'Sullivan
Elizabeth Smither
Chris Tse
Ian Wedde
Ashleigh Young

2014
2014's guest editor was Vincent O'Sullivan.

Peter Bland
Amy Brown
Geoff Cochrane
Kay McKenzie Cooke
John Dennison
Cliff Fell
Rogelio Guedea
Dinah Hawken
Caoilinn Hughes
Kevin Ireland
Anna Jackson
Michael Jackson
Michele Leggott
Owen Marshall
Emma Neale
Gregory O'Brien
Peter Olds
Claire Orchard
Nina Powles
Joanna Preston
Helen Rickerby
Kerrin P Sharpe
Marty Smith
Elizabeth Smither
Brian Turner

2015
2015's guest editor was John Newton.

Morgan Bach
Serie Barford
Sarah Jane Barnett
David Beach
Hera Lindsay Bird
Wystan Curnow
John Dennison
Belinda Diepenheim
Murray Edmond
Joan Fleming
Bernadette Hall
Dinah Hawken
Alexandra Hollis
Brent Kininmont
Iain Lonie
Selina Tusitala Marsh
Frankie McMillan
Gregory O'Brien
Vincent O'Sullivan
Frances Samuel
kani te manukura
Steven Toussaint
Bryan Walpert
Alison Wong
Ashleigh Young

2016
2016's guest editor was Jenny Bornholdt.

 Nick Ascroft
 Tusiata Avia 
 Airini Beautrais
 Hera Lindsay Bird
 James Brown
 Rachel Bush
 John Dennison
 Ish Doney 
 Lynley Edmeades
 Rata Gordon
 Bernadette Hall 
 Scott Hamilton
 Adrienne Jansen
 Andrew Johnston
 Anna Livesey
 Bill Manhire
 Leslie McKay
 Bill Nelson
 Claire Orchard
 Vincent O'Sullivan
 Kerrin P. Sharpe
 Marty Smith
 Oscar Upperton
 Tim Upperton
 Ashleigh Young

2017 
2017's guest editor was Selina Tusitala Marsh. Marsh said she wanted "to be able to map the latest constellation of Aotearoa's poetry stars and navigate the various poetic journeys being offered from a particular time and place"; the collection included "Pākaitore" by Airini Beautrais about the 1995 protest at Moutoa Gardens.

 Airini Beautrais
 Liz Breslin 
 Janet Charman
 Makyla Curtis
 Annelyse Gelman
 Gregory Kan
 Ben Kemp
 Jiaqiao Liu 
 Ria Masae
 Courtney Sina Meredith
 Hannah Mettner 
 Karlo Mila
 Tru Paraha
 Nina Powles
 Vaughan Rapatahana
 Emma Shi
 Carin Smeaton
 Marty Smith
 Mere Taito
 Angela Troloven
 Jamie Trower
 Chris Tse
 Louise Wallace
 Albert Wendt
 Briar Woof

Notes

External links

Poetry anthologies
New Zealand poetry
21st-century New Zealand literature
Anthology series